Yahya Mohamed Abdullah Saleh is the nephew of former Yemeni president Ali Abdullah Saleh, and was a chair staff of the approx. 50,000 strong Central Security Organization from 2001 to 21 May 2012. His father is Major General Mohammed Abdullah Saleh. Saleh was replaced with Major General Fadhel Bin Yahiya al-Qusi.

Following his dismissal Yahya sent a letter to President Abdrabbuh Mansur Hadi, expressing his support for Hadi.

References 

Living people
Yemeni politicians
People of the Yemeni Revolution
1965 births
Saleh family
People from Sanaa